Avraamy Bogdanovich Aslanbegov or Aslanbekov (22 September [O.S. 10 September] 1822, Baku – 20 December [O.S. 7 December] 1900, Saint Petersburg) was a vice-admiral and military writer of the Russian Empire of Kabardian origin.

Career
A convert to Eastern Orthodox Christianity, Aslanbegov graduated with honours from the Naval Cadet Corps in 1837. He started his military career by serving in the Baltic Fleet. After obtaining his officer rank he began serving in the Black Sea Fleet. Aslanbegov participated in the Crimean War of 1854–1856 and fought alongside Pavel Nakhimov during the Siege of Sevastopol. In the late 1850s and the 1860s he continued to serve in the Baltic and the Black Sea, and sailed across the Mediterranean. In the early 1870s he was member of the committee in charge of developing the sea-borne trade. In 1879 Aslanbegov was appointed Commander of the Pacific Ocean Squadron. In 1881 he circumnavigated the globe from the Baltic through North America and Asia-Pacific to the Far East where he served until his retirement in 1882.

References

ЦГА ВМФ, ф. 41, 26 ед. хр., 1841-1892. 
РГВИА (РГАВМФ), ф. 171, 6 ед. хр., 1793-1855.

External links
 Rear-Admiral Aslanbegov's Journey to Australia in 1881-1882 by Alexander Massov

1822 births
1900 deaths
Military personnel from Baku
Imperial Russian Navy admirals
Russian military personnel of the Crimean War
Azerbaijani emigrants to Russia
Military writers from the Russian Empire
Eastern Orthodox Christians from Azerbaijan
Azerbaijani former Shia Muslims
Converts to Eastern Orthodoxy from Shia Islam
Recipients of the Order of the White Eagle (Russia)
Recipients of the Order of Saint Stanislaus (Russian)
Russian nobility
Naval Cadet Corps alumni